Woodbury is a home rule-class city in Butler County, Kentucky, United States. The population was 90 at the 2010 census.

History
Woodbury was incorporated in 1856.

Geography
It is situated on the west bank of the Green River.

Climate

Demographics

As of the census of 2000, there were 87 people, 35 households, and 26 families residing in the city. The racial makeup of the city was 100.00% White. Hispanic or Latino of any race were 2.30% of the population.

There were 35 households, out of which 34.3% had children under the age of 18 living with them, 68.6% were married couples living together, 5.7% had a female householder with no husband present, and 25.7% were non-families. 25.7% of all households were made up of individuals, and 5.7% had someone living alone who was 65 years of age or older. The average household size was 2.49 and the average family size was 3.00.

In the city, the population was spread out, with 21.8% under the age of 18, 8.0% from 18 to 24, 37.9% from 25 to 44, 26.4% from 45 to 64, and 5.7% who were 65 years of age or older. The median age was 41 years. For every 100 females, there were 93.3 males. For every 100 females age 18 and over, there were 94.3 males.

The median income for a household in the city was $38,750, and the median income for a family was $45,000. Males had a median income of $38,333 versus $17,500 for females. The per capita income for the city was $15,564. There were 7.1% of families and 11.1% of the population living below the poverty line, including 16.0% of under eighteens and 50.0% of those over 64.

Notable person
Claude C. Bloch, admiral who commanded the local Naval District at Pearl Harbor at the time of the Japanese attack during World War II

References

Cities in Butler County, Kentucky
Cities in Kentucky
Populated places established in 1986